Malesherbia fasciculata is a subshrub that is native to the subtropics of Northern and Central Chile. The flowers of M. fasciculata are white with red sepals, dark purple anthers, and are globular in shape.

M. fasciculata was one of the species selected for the 1000 Plant Transcriptome project.

Varieties 
There are two varieties of M. fasciculata; var. fasciculata and var. glandulosa.

M. fasciculata var. fasciculata (D.don) is found in Coquimbo, Valparaíso, Metropolitana and Del General Libertador Bernardo O'Higgins in a variety of biomes.

M. fasciculata var. glandulosa (Ricardi) is much more localized, having only been identified at the Hurtado river's basin within the Coquimbo region.

The varieties differ from each other by the number of flowers formed on each stem, var. fasciculata will have 3-7 flowers whereas var. glandulosa has a single flower per stem. Additionally, var. glandulosa has matted hairs and glandular hairs on the leaves and apex of sepals.

References 

Flora of Chile
fasciculata